The Imam Al Ghazali Mosque is a mosque in Kuala Lumpur, Malaysia. This mosque is located at Bandar Manjalara and was named after Imam Al-Ghazali, a Muslim philosopher.

See also
 Islam in Malaysia

Mosques in Kuala Lumpur